Rata Alice Lovell-Smith (née Bird, 1894–1969) was a New Zealand artist from Christchurch.

Lovell-Smith trained at the Christchurch College School of Arts and then taught there from 1924 to 1945.

Style and subject
Her paintings were generally of landscapes, botany, and flowers. She always painted in situ and never painted from notes. Sometimes, she would have several paintings on the go from the same location, each with different weather. Lovell-Smith's painting style is characterised by bold design, broad flat areas of colour, and an almost poster-like style. She emphasised basic patterns and shapes, sometimes exaggerating the intensity of colours. At the time, some critics responded to it by saying it went "counter to good tradition" or that it smacked of commercial art, while others defended her saying:

Lovell-Smith can be understood as part of a movement of New Zealand artists in the 1930s, including Olivia Spencer-Bower, Rita Angus, and Alfred Cook, whom art writers A.R.D Fairburn, James Shelley and '"Conrad" recognised as providing a "new manner" of painting better representing New Zealand and its light. This included the removal of romantic or golden mist and soft warm colour, and a move towards clear hard light, and displaying sheer, sharp, more linear forms.

Exhibitions
From 1924 until 1966 Lovell-Smith exhibited at the Canterbury Society of Art. In 1933, Lovell-Smith was included in the first general exhibition of the New Zealand Society of Artists. From 1935 she regularly exhibited with The Group (with Cora Wilding, Ngaio Marsh, Evelyn Page, and Louise Henderson). In 1940 Lovell-Smith was included in the Centennial Exhibition of New Zealand Artists in Wellington.

Awards
In 1939 Lovell-Smith was awarded the Bledisloe Medal for Landscapes for her Punga by the Auckland Society of Art.

Marriage
Rata Alice Bird married fellow artist Colin Stuart Lovell-Smith (1894-1960) 8 February 1922. He was the youngest brother of Kitty Lovell-Smith.

Further reading 
Anne Kirker, New Zealand Women Artists: A Survey of 150 Years (1986, Craftsman House)

References

1894 births
1969 deaths
New Zealand women painters
20th-century New Zealand painters
People from Christchurch
20th-century New Zealand women artists
People associated with The Group (New Zealand art)